
Gmina Łowicz is a rural gmina (administrative district) in Łowicz County, Łódź Voivodeship, in central Poland. Its seat is the town of Łowicz, although the town is not part of the territory of the gmina.

Villages
Gmina Łowicz contains the villages and settlements of Bocheń, Dąbkowice Dolne, Dąbkowice Górne, Guźnia, Jamno, Jastrzębia, Klewków, Małszyce, Mystkowice, Niedźwiada, Ostrów, Otolice, Parma, Pilaszków, Placencja, Popów, Strzelcew, Świące, Świeryż Drugi, Świeryż Pierwszy, Szczudłów, Urbańszczyzna, Wygoda, Zabostów Duży, Zabostów Mały, Zawady and Zielkowice.

Neighbouring gminas
Gmina Łowicz is bordered by the town of Łowicz and by the gminas of Bielawy, Chąśno, Domaniewice, Kocierzew Południowy, Łyszkowice, Nieborów and Zduny.

References
 Polish official population figures 2006

Lowicz
Łowicz County
Łowicz